Duan Guocheng (born 1973) is a Chinese serial killer who robbed, assaulted, and killed 13 women in Wuhan, Hubei province, in Central China, from 1999 to 2001. Nicknamed “The Red-dress killer” or  “The Red-dress slasher”, because his victims were lone women walking alone either wearing red-dresses or another type of red, he sparked a panic among women in Central China, with public officials warning them to stop wearing red throughout the years he was active.

Early years 
Little is known about Duan's early years. He was most likely born in Wuhan, the capital city of Hubei province, sometime in 1973. What is known is that he grew up in a poor and disadvantaged environment, with his parents frequently moving him from place to place, which sparked loneliness in the young Duan. In his adolescence, he started breaking and entering, which caused him to stay in a Juvenile Detention center for most of his teen years.

Murder Investigation 
In mid-1999, the Wuhan Police became aware of a string of murders of young women, usually in their 20s, in the city's unlit alleyways at night, and advised a failed curfew for university students. Soon realizing they had a serial killer on their hands, they looked for any possible links all the victims had to one another. The first murder was in April 1999, when the perpetrator stabbed a 24-year-old women almost 40 times until she died. 
The killer's victim type was women in their early 20s who had a normal build. He attacked them in unlit alleyways or under unlit streetlights. His preferred weapon of choice was a knife, which he used to stab and slash his victims. He didn't sexually assault all of his victims, but that was deemed a leading motive.

"Red-dress" theory 
Chinese police came to the conclusion that the killer was targeting women wearing red dresses or other types of red, such as jackets, shirts, and pants. Public officials, and even the then Mayor Zhou Ji, put out warnings to women to not wear red.

Arrest 
On August 15, 2001, police circled in on Duan, and finally broke the case by matching footprints at the scene of four of the murders, to shoes found in Duan's hotel room. After positively identifying Duan as the killer, Chen Xunqiu, a high-ranking officer in Hubei announced to the public that they successfully broke the "psycho" case using high-tech methods and strategies.

Imprisonment 
Duan was sentenced to life imprisonment in 2003.

See also 
 List of serial killers by number of victims

References 

1973 births
1999 murders in China
2000 murders in China
2001 murders in China
21st-century Chinese criminals
Chinese rapists
Chinese serial killers
Living people
Male serial killers
People convicted of murder by China
History of Wuhan
Violence against women in China